Agus Suhendra (born August 17, 1988) is an Indonesian professional footballer who plays as a full-back.

Club career

Persal
He started his career in 2008 at a semi-professional club, Persal, to compete mainly in the third tier league in Indonesia. He spent playing there until 2013.

Persiraja
In 2014, he was scouted during an unofficial match by Persiraja and got an offer to join the club. However, he spent the first year mostly for their reserve team. In 2015, Indonesia competition was suspended. He broke into main squad when Persiraja competed in 2016 ISC B. He continued to become an integral part of Persiraja team for the following Liga 2 season 2017 and also in 2018. In 2019, he even helped Persiraja to secure a promotion to Liga 1. Persiraja extended his contract in 2020 to join the team competing in 2020 Liga 1. On February 29, 2020, he played his first Liga 1 game as a starting line-up when Persiraja played their first league game in 2020 season against Bhayangkara.

Club statistics

Honours

Club 
Persiraja Banda Aceh
  Liga 2 third place: 2019

References

External links 
 
 

1988 births
Association football defenders
Living people
Indonesian footballers
Liga 1 (Indonesia) players
Persiraja Banda Aceh players
Sportspeople from Aceh